Renate Ostermann (14 June 1937 – 26 December 2015) was a German tennis player.

Ostermann, who came from Krefeld, twice made the round of 16 in singles at Wimbledon.

In 1963 she featured in West Germany's first ever Federation Cup tie, partnering Edda Buding in the doubles rubber, which they lost to France's Françoise Dürr and Janine Lieffrig.

References

External links
 
 

1937 births
2015 deaths
West German female tennis players
Sportspeople from Krefeld
Tennis people from North Rhine-Westphalia